Blue Ridge Community College may refer to:
Blue Ridge Community College (Virginia), a community college near Weyers Cave, Virginia
Blue Ridge Community College (North Carolina), a community college in Flat Rock, Henderson County, North Carolina
Blue Ridge Community and Technical College, a community college in Martinsburg, West Virginia